Committee on Armed Services can refer to:

 United States Senate Committee on Armed Services
 United States House Committee on Armed Services